Gianfranco Mingozzi (5 April 1932 – 7 October 2009) was an Italian director and screenwriter.

Life and career 
Born in Bologna,  Mingozzi got a degree in Law, then enrolled at the Centro Sperimentale di Cinematografia in Rome, graduating in 1958. After being assistant of Federico Fellini, René Clément, Philippe de Broca and Gianni Franciolini, in 1962  he debuted as a screenwriter for La vita provvisoria, and then made his directorial debut  with "La vedova bianca", a segment of the anthology film Le italiane e l'amore. He was also a critically acclaimed documentarist.

Selected filmography 

 Con il cuore fermo Sicilia (1965)
 Sardinia Kidnapped (1968) 
 Flavia the Heretic (1974)
 Gli ultimi tre giorni (1977)
 Exploits of a Young Don Juan (1986)  
 Il frullo del passero (1988)

References

External links 
 

1932 births
2009 deaths
Italian film directors
20th-century Italian screenwriters
Italian male screenwriters
Film people from Bologna
20th-century Italian male writers